Stuart "Stu" O. Simms (born July 17, 1950) is a Maryland politician, who ran unsuccessfully for the Democratic Party's nomination in the 2006 election for Attorney General of the state of Maryland in the United States.

Simms was born in Baltimore, Maryland and attended the prestigious Gilman School in Baltimore. He received his undergraduate degree from Dartmouth College and his law degree from Harvard Law School.

In 1983, he was appointed Deputy State's Attorney for Baltimore City, serving until 1987. He was later elected to the position of State's Attorney and served two four-year terms from 1987 to 1995.

From 1995 to 2003, he served in the Cabinet of Governor Parris Glendening as Secretary of the Maryland Department of Juvenile Services from 1995 to 1997, and as Secretary of the Maryland Department of Public Safety and Correctional Services, one of the state's largest agencies, with 12,000 employees and a budget of $900 million from 1997 to 2003.

Simms worked for the Baltimore-based law firm Brown, Goldstein, and Levy from 2003 to 2020.

Simms and his wife, Candace Simms, have two adult sons, Paul and Marcus.  Both sons are also Gilman School graduates.

2006 Maryland Attorney General Primary election

External links
 Stu Simms-Partner-Brown, Goldstein, and Levy
 Maryland State Archives Biography

1950 births
Living people
State cabinet secretaries of Maryland
African-American state cabinet secretaries
Politicians from Baltimore
Assistant United States Attorneys
State's attorneys in Maryland
Maryland Democrats
Gilman School alumni
Dartmouth College alumni
Harvard Law School alumni
African-American lawyers
Candidates in the 2006 United States elections
21st-century American politicians
African-American people in Maryland politics
21st-century African-American politicians
20th-century African-American people